Mighty Lak' a Rose is a 1923 American silent drama film produced and directed by Edwin Carewe and distributed by Associated First National, later First National Pictures. This film stars James Rennie, Anders Randolf, and Dorothy Mackaill in her first starring role.

Plot
As described in a film magazine, Jerome Trevor (Hardy), international pianist, pays a visit to an orphanage and is deeply struck by the talent of blind lass Rose Duncan (Mackaill) for violin playing. Learning that she has an uncle in New York City, he decides to make arrangements by which she can live with her relative and be advanced in her art. But while on her way, her uncle is killed by an automobile. Rose at Pennsylvania Station meets gang leader Bull Morgan (Randolf). In order to avoid arrest, Bull poses as her uncle, intending to desert her later that day. Later some gangsters direct Rose to Bull's headquarters. Bull realizes that the young blind woman could become a useful aid and she becomes a member of the gang. Jimmy Harrison (Rennie), a member of the gang, falls under the magic of Roses's wonderful music and her gentle ways. Rose is unaware that she is consorting with criminals and utilized to attract people to the front of a house while the gang operates in the rear. Finally Jimmy and Bull engage in a fight over Rose, and she is accidentally hit over the head and knocked senseless. While she is ill, her pleading with the gang has such good results that even Bull gives in and all resolve to take the straight path. However, after a famous surgeon states that Rose's sight can be restored by an operation, the gang decides to commit one final robbery to obtain the money. As a result, Jimmy is arrested and sent to jail. Jerome finds Rose and her music training is assured and her sight restored. Unaware of his arrest, she thinks Jimmy has deserted her. At the end of two years, Rose makes a successful debut. Jimmy, finally released, goes with his old companions to the reception to honor Rose. Although her gratitude to Jerome has led to an engagement with him, she breaks it in favor of the faithful Jimmy.

Cast
 James Rennie as Jimmy Harrison
 Sam Hardy as Jerome Trevor
 Anders Randolf as Bull Morgan
 Harry Short as 'Slippery Eddie' Foster
 Dorothy Mackaill as Rose Duncan
 Helene Montrose as 'Hard-Boiled' Molly Malone
 Paul Panzer as Humpty Logan
 Dora Mills Adams as Mrs. Trevor

Preservation
Mighty Lak' a Rose is considered to be a lost film.

References

External links

 The AFI Catalog of Feature Films: Mighty Lak' a Rose
 Surviving still: James Rennie, Dorothy Mackaill, pooch (University of Washington, Sayre collection)

1923 films
1923 drama films
Silent American drama films
American silent feature films
American black-and-white films
Films directed by Edwin Carewe
First National Pictures films
Lost American films
1923 lost films
Lost drama films
1920s American films